Signal Hill is an unincorporated community in Centreville Township, Stookey Township, and the city of Belleville, St. Clair County, Illinois, United States.
Signal Hill dates back to 1904, during the Saint Louis World Fair, when the Signal Hill Park addition was platted.  The tree-lined, island separated, boulevard is the centerpiece of the community filled with large, elegant homes dated to the creation of the community.

Education

Students in the community will attend Signal Hill School, comprising grades Pre-K to 8th grade, and Belleville West High School.

Public schools
Signal Hill School District 181
Belleville Township High School District 201
Belleville High School-West

Private schools
Althoff Catholic High School
Governor French Academy

Higher education
Southern Illinois University Edwardsville
Southwestern Illinois College

Community Associations
Signal Hill is representative by two active neighborhood associations that liaison with local government officials, and help create public-private partnerships that enrich the community.
Signal Hill Neighborhood Association
The Top of the Hill Neighborhood Association

References 

Unincorporated communities in St. Clair County, Illinois
Unincorporated communities in Illinois